Mohammad Din is a former wrestler from Pakistan who competed in many international events, including the 1960 Summer Olympics.

Career
Mohammad Din was born on October 9, 1936 in Jalandhar, India later moving to Faisalabad, Pakistan in 1947 where he began his wrestling career. Mohammed was Pakistan Champion from 1957 to 1960.

Olympics

He competed in the 1960 Summer Olympics in Rome. The wrestling events during the games were held at the Basilica of Maxentius  During Din's appearance at the Olympics he competed in the lightweight (67 kg) division and was ranked joint 12th out of 24. Achieving the following results;
1st round; Beat to M Tajiki (IRN) by fall
2nd round; Beat N Stamulis (AUS) on pts
3rd round; Beat R Bielle (FRA) on pts

Post Retirement
Following his retirement in 1968, Din moved his family from Pakistan to Manchester, UK. Married to Basheran and with 5 children (Nadeem, Nabeela, Nighat, Naveed & Nafees) and subsequently 13 grandchildren. Mohammed began a small sweet shop in Manchester, Nafees Sweet Centre, named after his youngest son Nafees Din  the well known cricketer. Latterly, the family also began a sports shop in honour of Mohammad Din named ND Sports.

References

External links
 

1936 births
Living people
Olympic wrestlers of Pakistan
Wrestlers at the 1960 Summer Olympics
Pakistani male sport wrestlers
Commonwealth Games medallists in wrestling
Commonwealth Games bronze medallists for Pakistan
Wrestlers at the 1954 British Empire and Commonwealth Games
Medallists at the 1954 British Empire and Commonwealth Games